Snauwaert is an Italian sports equipment manufacturer, focused on tennis and paddle tennis, producing mainly rackets. It was founded in Beveren-Roeselare (Belgium) in 1928 by the brothers-in-law Valler Snauwaert and Eugeen Depla.

Products
The Ergonom is one of the most unusual rackets ever produced, featuring a rotating head that allegedly stayed in line with the path of the ball longer than a conventional racket head.

The racket was invented, designed and patented in the 1980s by the Italian entrepreneur and tennis enthusiast Carlo Gibello, who invented the Duralift, the plastic string cross saver.

Sponsorships
Famous tennis players who used Snauwaert include:

  Bjorn Borg
  Evonne Goolagong Cawley
  Miloslav Mečíř
  Tomáš Šmíd
  Mikael Pernfors
  Vitas Gerulaitis
  Brian Gottfried
  John McEnroe

References

External links 

Italian brands
Tennis equipment
Racket sports
Sports equipment